Gøtudanskt/Dano-Faroese (pronounced , Faroese for "(Norðra)gøta Danish" or alternatively "street Danish") is a name for a variant of Danish language spoken in the Faroe Islands. Its intonation and pronunciation are influenced by Faroese.

Etymology 

Poulsen (1993) attributes the term to a teacher (1850–1930) from the small village of Gøta on Eysturoy who spoke Danish with a pronounced accent, his idiolect forming the basis of many of the common features of Gøtudanskt.

Definition of Gøtudanskt 

Gøtudanskt is highly proficient (L2) Danish spoken mainly as the written Danish standard by Faroe Islanders with Faroese interference at all levels of language processing. It is characteristic of the elder generation. The younger generation usually (but not always) uses standard Danish pronunciation. 

An example of Gøtudanskt is the jingle "" ‘Away from the road! The king is sledding’, where  comes from the Faroese verb  ‘to sled’.

The traditional Faroese way of singing hymns (the Kingo song) uses Gøtudanskt. The metal band Týr's songs "Ramund Hin Unge" on the album Eric the Red and "Sinklars vísa" on the album Land are also sung in Gøtudanskt.

See also 
 Dano-Norwegian
 Stadsfries dialects
 Missingsch
 Jopara language
 Diglossia

References

 Petersen, H. P. (to appear) Væk af vejen, konge skrejen. Gøtudanskt or Dano-Faroese. RASK
 Poulsen, J. H. W. 1993. Gøtudanskt. Odense University Press. — Twenty-eight papers presented to Hans Bekker-Nielsen on the occasion of his sixtieth birthday, 28 April 1993.

North Germanic languages
Faroese language
Danish language
Danish dialects
Mixed languages